Captain Richard Boswell Rushall  (April 1865 – 3 February 1953) was a British sea captain and businessman who served as mayor of Rangoon, Burma, during the 1930s. He was the first Englishman to hold this position. Born in Braunston, Northamptonshire, Rushall was the eldest of eight children. After finishing school he left for sea, joined the UK's Merchant Navy, and became a ship's captain. He spent 20 years with the Irrawaddy Flotilla Company, of which 17 were in command of steamships belonging to the company. In 1908 he settled in Rangoon with his family, resigned from the Irrawaddy Flotilla Company and founded Rushall & Co. Ltd., a stevedoring and contracting business that employed between 3,000 and 4,000 men.

In December 1922 Rushall was elected as an Honorary Magistrate, and was subsequently made a Member of the Order of the British Empire (MBE) for his distinguished service during the First World War. He was elected as mayor of Rangoon in January 1930, in an election that was described by Singapore's The Straits Times as having given "universal satisfaction". During his time as mayor, he sought to improve the accommodation and quality of care in the city hospital and to ensure that a fair share of stevedoring jobs in Rangoon were allotted to native dock labourers. During the Second World War Rushall evacuated to Bombay; he died at the age of 87 in Rangoon, where he was commended by U Kyaw Tha for his work and character as mayor.

Early life and naval career
Richard Boswell Rushall was born in April 1865 in Braunston, Northamptonshire, and was the eldest of eight children. His father, Benjamin Rushall (1825–1900), was a saddler; his mother was Mary Boswell (1843–1918). After finishing school as a young man, Rushall left for sea and joined the Merchant Navy; he served as third officer on one of the British-India Steam Navigation Company's coasting steamers. He first began to reside permanently in Rangoon at the age of 20, and in 1886 he joined the Irrawaddy Flotilla Company. He stayed with the company for 20 years, of which 17 were spent in command of their steamships. He earned his certificate of competency as second mate from the Lords of Trade on 8 March 1888, and eventually rose to the rank of ship's captain – he was aboard one of the final ships to travel under sail around Cape Horn. He married his first wife, Jane Amelia Graham (1872–1899), on 10 September 1892 in Burma, at the age of 27. He and Jane had two children together: Nancy (born 1897) and Benjamin Thomas (1898–1980). Jane died on 19 June 1899.

Business

While in Rangoon, Rushall met and married Charlotte Sarah Trype (1882–1933)—the daughter of the local station manager—and settled in the city in 1908 with his second wife and their three daughters: Ella Irene (born 1905), Charlotte Mary (1907–1963), and Cecelia. Whilst there, he resigned from the Irrawaddy Flotilla Company and, in 1906, founded Rushall & Co. Ltd., a stevedoring and contracting business located at 121 Judah Ezekiel Street (now Thein Phyu Road) next to the docks of the city. The company employed between 3,000 and 4,000 men. Over the following years, Rushall and Charlotte had three further children: Edna Helen (1909–1910), Richard Boswell (1911–2002) and Edgar Boswell (1916–2002). Charlotte left with the family in 1913 for Rugby, Warwickshire, where she set up and managed two businesses: a brick factory and Rugby Motor Transport Co., a haulage contracting business dealing in lorries and charabancs. Rushall remained in Rangoon to tend to his own company. Charlotte died in Rugby on 30 April 1933, with the Rugby Motor Transport Co. being wound-up two months later.

Politics
During the First World War, Rushall worked as harbourmaster at Rangoon's harbour, and in December 1922 he was elected as an Honorary Magistrate in the Rangoon Municipal Elections, whereupon he devoted himself to the improvement of the city's public parks and war memorial. He worked for eight years as a Councillor of the Corporation of Rangoon, and was subsequently made an MBE for his distinguished service during the war. He served as Chairman of the Roads and Buildings Committee, and also sat on the committees for public health and markets, playgrounds, and the protection of waifs and strays. From 1928 he was vice president of the hospital and governor of Rangoon University.  Other public offices that he held included governor of the gaol and member of the Reformatory School Board.

As a result of his public service in Rangoon, Rushall became known to Thibaw Min, the last king of Burma's Konbaung dynasty, and in 1925 he attended the funeral of Supayalat, the king's favourite wife. On 6 January 1930, Rushall became the first Englishman to be elected mayor of Rangoon, and was seen as a popular choice for the position – at the time, Singapore's paper The Straits Times described his election as having given "universal satisfaction". According to the Rugby Advertiser, Rushall was "extremely popular both among the European and the native population of the city", and was "well known for his numerous acts of kindliness and charity".

Rushall's first year as mayor proved to be challenging: in March he was compelled to give at evidence at the trial of Jatindra Mohan Sengupta, the mayor of Calcutta, who was accused of sedition in speeches he had made during a visit to Rangoon. During the trial a riot erupted outside the courthouse. In May, further riots—this time of anti-Burmese Indian sentiment—sprung up in Rangoon and across the rest of the country following a strike by Indian coolies. One such riot lasted throughout the night of 26 May, and resulted in the deaths of 120 Indians and more than 900 injuries. When Rushall's son Richard came to visit him during this time, Rushall immediately sent him up the Rangoon River and away from the civil disorder for 2–3 months. In November, Rushall supported a resolution to improve the accommodation and quality of care in the city hospital, and the following year, he sat on a committee to ensure that a fair share of stevedoring jobs in Rangoon were allotted to native dock labourers.

Later life and death
Following the Japanese invasion of Burma in early 1942, Rushall evacuated from the country with his daughter Nancy. He stayed out the Second World War in Bombay, but eventually returned to Rangoon, where he died on 3 February 1953, at the age of 87. Upon his death, U Kyaw Tha—chairman of the Commissioners of the Port of Rangoon—commended him as a "born gentleman", and praised his work at the city's hospital and his "kindliness and infectious friendliness".

Notes

References

1864 births
1953 deaths
19th-century English businesspeople
British people in British Burma
Mayors of Yangon
Members of the Order of the British Empire
Sea captains
People from Braunston